Chahatt Khanna is an Indian actress. She is known for playing Ayesha in Bade Achhe Lagte Hain and Nida in Qubool Hai.

Career
Chahatt started her career at the age of 16. Her first shoot was in a Cadbury's advertisement, with Pradeep Sarkar in 2002. Her first TV show was also from 2002, called Sachi Baat Sabhi Jag Jane. Her first break in movies was with 7½ Phere. The same year she was seen as one of the cast of the thriller The Film (2005). The movie revolves around the lives of struggling film artists. Chahatt also did a cameo in the show Hero - Bhakti Hi Shakti Hai in 2005, she was playing the role of Queen Mayra.

She was later seen in Sony TV's show Kajjal.

In 2009, she was seen in Ek Main Ek Tum and later in squad leader on MTV Stuntmania.

Personal life
Khanna was first married to Bharat Narsinghani in December 2006, but got divorced after several months, alleging Narsinghani physically abused her. Their courtship had started in 2002 when she was 16. Her second husband is Farhan Mirza whom she married in February 2013. She married Farhan Mirza, the son of Shahrukh Mirza on 8 February 2013. The couple has two daughters. She filed for divorce in 2018 citing sexual and mental harassment.

Filmography

Films

Television

References

External links

 
 

Living people
Indian television actresses
Actresses from Mumbai
21st-century Indian actresses
1986 births